Daku Mansoor (Mansoor The Dacoit) also called Karishma-E-Kudrat is a 1934 Hindi/Urdu costume action drama film directed by Nitin Bose. The film was produced by New Theatres Ltd. Calcutta and the music director was R. C. Boral. The cast of the film included
K. L. Saigal, Uma Shashi,  Prithviraj Kapoor, Husnbanu, Pahari Sanyal and Nemo. Daku Mansoor was actress Husn Banu’s debut film.

The film was based on a Bengali folktale and involves the dacoit Mansoor (K. L. Saigal) and his love first for Paribanu (Husn Banu), and then for Meher (Uma Sashi), and ultimately the rejection of his way of life.

Plot
Mansoor (K. L. Saigal) is a dacoit who falls in love with Husn Pari (Husn Banu), the sister of the evil caliph. His escapades bring him notoriety and Mansoor moves to a new place where he stays as a guest at the merchant Ali's house. Ali and his family have no knowledge of Mansoor's past. Ali's daughter, Meher (Uma Sashi), starts loving Mansoor but he rebuffs her as he is still in love with Husn Pari. On learning that Husn Pari is to be married off by her brother, Mansoor becomes enraged. There follows a fight where Mansoor is badly beaten and in which Husn Pari gets stabbed by the dagger meant to kill Mansoor. Deeply affected, Mansoor gives up his dacoity and gets together with Meher.

Cast
K. L. Saigal
Umasashi
Prithviraj Kapoor
Husn Bano
Pahari Sanyal
Nemo

Review
T. M. Ramachandran called it "essentially a cameraman's (Nitin Bose) film" whose visuals evoked "more telling effects" than words could.

Songs
Songlist:

References

External links

Daku Mansoor (1934) on indiancine.ma
Daku Mansoor at Kundan Lal Saigal site

1934 films
1930s Hindi-language films
Indian black-and-white films
Indian action drama films
1930s action drama films
Films directed by Nitin Bose
1934 drama films